A patera was a saucer-shaped Roman drinking vessel.  In modern usage, it describes something similar to a shallow bowl or deep dish and may refer to:

Architecture
 Patera (architecture), an ornamental element.

Astronomy 
 Patera (planetary nomenclature), an irregular crater, or a complex crater with scalloped edges on a celestial body.

People 
 Patera Silk, fictional character in The Book of the Long Sun by Gene Wolfe
 Adolf Patera (1819-1894), Bohemian chemist, mineralogist and metallurgist
 Dennis Patera (b. 1945), American football player
 Jack Patera (1933–2018), former American football player and coach in the National Football League
 Ken Patera (b. 1942), retired professional wrestler, Olympic weightlifter, and Strongman competitor from Portland, Oregon
 Pavel Patera (b. 1971), professional ice hockey player from the Czech Republic
 Anthony Pateras (b. 1979), multidisciplinary musician in Melbourne, Australia
 Raúl Pateras Pescara de Castelluccio (1890-1966), marquis of Pateras-Pescara and an Argentine lawyer and inventor

Zoology 
 Patera (gastropod), an American genus of snails

Other Uses 
 A small decorative plate fixed to the base of a clock.